Christopher is a masculine given name.

Christopher may also refer to:

People 
 Christopher (singer) (born 1992), Danish singer
 Christopher of Bavaria (1416–1448), union king of Denmark (1440–1448), Sweden (1441–1448), and Norway (1442–1448)
 Christopher of Prague (born 1953), primate-elect of the Church of the Czech Lands and Slovakia
 Christopher of Werle (died 1425), Prince of the Wends
 Prince Christopher of Greece and Denmark (1888–1940), son of George I, King of Greece
 Saint Christopher (died 251), saint venerated by Catholics and Orthodox Christians

People with the surname
 Alfred Christopher (1820–1913), British clergyman and cricketer
 Brian Christopher (born 1987), American lacrosse player
 Brian Christopher (full name Brian Christopher Lawler, 1972–2018), American professional wrestler
 Dennis Christopher (born 1958), American actor
 Sir Robin Christopher (diplomat) (born 1944), British ambassador
 Robin Christopher (born 1965), American actress
 Sybil Christopher (1929–2013), Welsh actress
 Warren Christopher (1925–2011), American diplomat and politician
 William Christopher (1932–2016), American actor

Places

Canada
 Christopher Lake, a village in Saskatchewan
 Christopher Lake (Saskatchewan), a lake in Saskatchewan

United States
 Christopher, Georgia, a ghost town
 Christopher, Illinois, a city 
 Christopher, Kentucky, an unincorporated community
 Christopher, Missouri, an unincorporated community
 Christopher, Washington, a former community

Arts and entertainment

Fictional characters 
Christopher "Chris" Halliwell, a character in Charmed
Christopher Moltisanti, a fictional character on the HBO series The Sopranos
 Christopher Pike (Star Trek), captain of the USS Enterprise in the first Star Trek pilot ("The Cage") and in Star Trek (2009 film)
 Christopher Robin, a character in the Winnie-the-Pooh books by A. A. Milne

Music
 Christopher (Sleep album)
 Christopher (The Ruby Suns album)

Television
 "Christopher" (The Sopranos), a 2002 episode

Film
 Christopher (film), a Malayalam-language action thriller

Ships
 Christopher (ship), four merchant or slave ships
 Christopher (Liverpool slave ship), three ships

See also 
 Chris
 Christoph (disambiguation)
 Christophe (disambiguation)
 Christophers
 Kristapor

Surnames from given names